Mohamed Fouad Hamoumou is a visually impaired Algerian Paralympic athlete competing in T13-classification events. He represented Algeria at the 2016 Summer Paralympics in Rio de Janeiro, Brazil and he won the bronze medal in the men's 400 metres T13 event.

At the 2017 World Para Athletics Championships held in London, United Kingdom he won the bronze medal in the men's 400 metres T13 event.

At the 2018 World Para Athletics Tunis Grand Prix held in Tunis, Tunisia he won the gold medal in the men’s 400 metres T13 event.

References

External links 
 

Living people
Year of birth missing (living people)
Place of birth missing (living people)
Algerian male sprinters
Athletes (track and field) at the 2016 Summer Paralympics
Medalists at the 2016 Summer Paralympics
Paralympic bronze medalists for Algeria
Date of birth missing (living people)
Paralympic medalists in athletics (track and field)
Paralympic athletes of Algeria
21st-century Algerian people